HSN, an initialism of its former name Home Shopping Network, is an American free-to-air television network owned by the Qurate Retail Group, which also owns catalog company Cornerstone Brands. Based in the Gateway area of St. Petersburg, Florida, United States, the home shopping channel has former and current sister channels in several other countries.

History
The forerunner of HSN was launched by Lowell Paxson (who later established PAX-TV, which is now Ion Television) and Roy Speer in 1982 as the Home Shopping Club, a local cable channel seen on Vision Cable and Group W Cable in Pinellas County, Florida. It expanded into the first national shopping network three years later on July 1, 1985, changing its name to the Home Shopping Network, and pioneering the concept of a televised sales pitch for consumer goods and services. Its competitor and future owner QVC was launched the following year.

The idea for HSN had its roots in a radio station managed by Paxson. Due to an advertiser's liquidity problem in 1977, the company was paid in can openers. Left with having to raise the funds, on-air personality Bob Circosta went on the radio and sold the can openers for $9.95 each. The can openers sold out, and an industry was born. Circosta later became the new network's first ever home shopping host and would eventually sell 75,000 different products in over 20,000 hours of live television.

In 1986, HSN began a second network that broadcast free-to-air on a number of television stations it had acquired under the name Silver King Broadcasting. In 1992, HSN spun off from Silver King Broadcasting, and afterwards saw Liberty Media acquire stock in the network. In 1996, the station group was sold back to Silver King Broadcasting, which was now owned by Barry Diller, and changed its name to "HSN Inc." after its merger with Silver King was completed. Under Diller's leadership, the HSN also acquired the USA Network, Sci-Fi Channel and Universal Television in October 1997. This resulted in HSN Inc. being changed to USA Network Inc.

The USA Network purchase, which was finalized in February 1998,  resulted in the creation of USA Broadcasting television stations, and saw four of these stations, (WAMI-DT, WHOT-TV, WHUB-TV and KSTR) ending HSN programming outside of overnight hours and became independent stations with a local programming format known as CityVision that was similar to Toronto's Citytv; CityVision would be replaced by Telefutura in January 2002 after USA Broadcasting sold its stations to Univision Communications. HSN continues to air on low-power stations (one of these is owned in agreement by Univision). Ventana Television (ventana meaning window in Spanish) has the same street address as HSN, and is the holding company for its broadcast licenses.

In 1997, HSN formally launched its second nationwide electronic retail venture, a 24-hour network under the America's Store name (it had operated similar concepts of more limited scale since 1988). In April 2007, America's Store ceased operating permanently. Most of the America's Store hosts (some of which were already splitting hosting duties between networks) were absorbed into the HSN programming schedule.

In 1998, Home Shopping Network launched a Spanish-language service Home Shopping en Español on the Univision-owned Galavision subscription network. In 2000, the Spanish version rebranded itself as HSE and began broadcasting on low-power stations in the U.S. and Puerto Rico. It also ceased to broadcast through Galavision. In June 2002, HSE ceased to operate.

In 1999, the company launched a website, HSN.com. In an attempt to engage with younger consumers in 2009, HSN produced a 14-episode online video series, Faces of Beautiful You, which follows three young women who find solutions to many of life's problems through HSN's beauty products. The campaign included a Facebook widget, character blogs, and profiles for the three main characters on Twitter, MySpace, and Facebook.

In September 2000, Home Shopping Network officially changes its name to HSN.

Mindy Grossman became CEO of HSN in 2006, and aggressively reinvented and relaunched the brand. She took HSN public in 2008, and has overseen its multibillion-dollar retail portfolio and multimedia expansion. Grossman left HSNi in May 2017 to helm Weight Watchers. On August 19, 2012, HSN co-founder Roy Speer died after a long illness. Bud Paxson died on January 9, 2015.

In April 2017, HSN CEO Mindy Grossman stepped down to assume the CEO position at Weight Watchers. On July 6, 2017, Liberty Interactive announced it would buy the remaining 62% of HSN stock it did not already own in order to acquire the company for its QVC Group. QVC CEO Mike George would be CEO of the combined company.

In September 2018, HSN had partnered with Pickler & Ben talk show for a "shop the show" feature that allows viewers to buy featured items from HSN via the show's website and HSN.com.

On Friday, June 14, 2019, HSN ceased its 24/7 live broadcasting model. Live programming was rescheduled to be from 7am to 2am ET daily, with the midnight hour being repeated on a loop throughout the night.

On October 1, 2021, HSN rescheduled its live programming again, from 8am to 2am ET daily; its live broadcasting schedule was reduced by one hour.  On September 12, 2022, the live 7am to 8am ET hour was restored, albeit on weekdays only.

High definition
In August 2009, HSN launched a high definition simulcast feed, which broadcasts in the 1080i resolution format. At launch, it was carried by Time Warner Cable and Verizon FiOS, and like the SD feed, is now carried by most pay-TV providers.

Sister channels
HSN2, launched on August 1, 2010, acts as a timeshift channel carrying tape-delayed presentations of products and programming. Dish Network has carried it since launch.
America's Store, formerly the Home Shopping Club Overnight Service, was HSN's secondary service that was on the air from 1988 until April 2007.

International operations

United States
HSN's U.S. operations are based in St. Petersburg, Florida, which houses its corporate headquarters, studio and broadcasting facilities. Additional call center facilities are located in Roanoke, Virginia & Toledo, Ohio. Distribution centers are situated in Roanoke, Piney Flats, Tennessee, and Fontana, California. In October, 2018 Quarate announced the closure of the Roanoke distribution center in favor of a combined QVC/HSN distribution center to be located in Bethlehem, PA. HSN also operates retail outlet stores in Orlando, Brandon, Bardmoor, Tampa and St. Petersburg.

HSN is live 19 hours a day, 364 days a year (it has previously tested carrying recorded programming during some graveyard slot hours, but unsuccessful). During live broadcasts the word "LIVE" is inserted above the on air graphic on the top-right corner. HSN's hosts stay on the air for 2 or 3 hours and feature 5 to 10 products at a time. The channel usually ends live broadcasting for the Christmas holiday at about 4:00 pm EST Christmas Eve, and returns live at 11:00 pm EST Christmas Day. For the first twelve years, a looping Yule log was aired from Noon Christmas Eve to Midnight December 26. The show allowed members of the staff to go on camera with their families to say hello to relatives back home.

Previously aired broadcasts could be re-watched on the YouTube channel of HSN. HSN first uploaded full-length episodes for several of the most popular programs, for instance The Monday Night Show with Adam Freeman, in February 2016, then expanded it to cover all programming on August 26, 2016, including the pre-recorded Christmas broadcasts.

As of today, HSN and QVC is carried over the digital public airwaves and can be viewed without a cable subscription or a streaming device. Additionally a new Streaming service was introduced to cable providers which provides a different shopping experience compared to if a viewer went online and ordered merchandise.

United Kingdom
HSN had a UK sister network called HSE, which ceased operating.

Germany
HSN has a sister network in Europe called HSE24. ("Home Shopping Europe")

Japan
HSN's sister network in Japan is known as The Shop Channel.

Canada
The Shopping Channel was launched in 1987 as Canadian Home Shopping Network (CHSN), HSN's sister network in Canada. In 1999, the station was sold to Rogers Communications and is no longer affiliated with HSN.

Philippines
Home Shopping Network is currently aired in the Philippines via Shop TV, a shopping channel owned by Solar Entertainment Corporation. It is also aired as a paid advertising block on RPN, IBC, BEAM TV, AksyonTV and most of the channels owned by Solar Entertainment Corporation including Diva Universal Philippines which is a joint venture with NBCUniversal. In 2015, the HSN brand is no longer named on screen, but they used the shopping channel's name.

Italy
Home Shopping Europe was launched in Italy in 2001 as Home Shopping Europe, replacing H.O.T. Italia (when this acronym intended the television channel Home Order Television). In 2003, the frequencies of HSE were sold to Mediaset and the channel was renamed Mediashopping. In 2011, Home Shopping Europe bought the channel back; the channel was renamed HSE24.

Technology

Call center
HSN National began with a standard rotary phone system that concentrated calls to the front of the queue. This corresponded to the front row of order takers in the HSN Studio at the Levitz Center (so named as the location was a former Levitz furniture store) in Clearwater, Florida. After several months, this system was no longer adequate and HSN entered a phase where a phone system from GTE was used. HSN claimed that the systems' inability to handle the high call volumes resulted in a loss of business. HSN sued GTE for $1.5 billion. In a counter-libel suit, GTE claimed that HSN had slandered the company; GTE won a $100 million judgment. Both parties settled out of court.

Original order taking system
HSN developed its original order taking system on a Burroughs Large System mainframe using the LINC 10 fourth generation language.

See also
 Home shopping host
 List of over-the-air Home Shopping Network affiliates

References

External links
 
 Home Shopping Network – The History, Technology and story

Television channels and stations established in 1982
Retail companies established in 1982
Retail companies of the United States
Companies based in St. Petersburg, Florida
Television stations in the Tampa Bay area
Companies formerly listed on the Nasdaq
Shopping networks in the United States
1982 establishments in Florida
Television networks in the United States